Me Gusta Bailar Contigo (English: I Like To Dance With You) is the twelfth studio album by Juan Gabriel, originally released in 1979 and re-released in 1996 as Del otro lado del puente. This album features songs from the film Del otro lado del puente.

Track listing

References

External links 
Me Gusta Bailar Contigo on Amazon.com

Juan Gabriel soundtracks
Spanish-language soundtracks
1979 soundtrack albums
Film soundtracks
RCA Records soundtracks